Class 252 was the classification allocated to the prototype High Speed Train (HST) unit, numbered 252001.

History

When originally built, in 1972, the prototype High Speed Train (HST) units were considered to be formed of two locomotives at either end of a rake of carriages. As a result, the power cars were designated Class 41 and numbered 41001/41002, while the carriages were given numbers in the new Mark 3 carriage number series.

Shortly after their introduction, it was decided to classify the unit as a Diesel Electric Multiple Unit. It was allocated Class 252, and the whole formation was renumbered into a new carriage number series for HST and Advanced Passenger Train vehicles (4xxxx). Two coaches were not included in the renumbering (one Trailer First and one Trailer Second), as these were transferred for use in the Royal Train as part of its upgrade before the Silver Jubilee of Elizabeth II. The power cars were allocated numbers in the 43xxx series, and the two prototype cars took the numbers 43000/43001. Thus, the production-run cars were numbered from 43002 onwards.

Ironically, the situation reversed again in the 1980s, and the production power cars were then considered to be class 43, as this time around no power car or carriage was renumbered. By this time, the prototype cars had been transferred into departmental (non-revenue earning) service and had taken numbers in the departmental carriage 975xxx series, so they were not involved in this redesignation, and they retained their departmental carriage numbers rather than being transferred to the departmental locomotive list.

The former 41002/43001 has now been scrapped, but the other prototype locomotive, 41001/43000, was preserved at the National Railway Museum, York. Of the passenger-carrying vehicles, all remain in use on the mainline, except for one of the former restaurant cars, which was scrapped in 1993.

The 125 Group restored prototype powercar 41001 back to operational condition in 2013. This entailed a complete restoration of the vehicle and a fitment of a Paxman Valenta engine at Neville Hill TMD. The engine was successfully started in July 2013, and on 31 May 2014 the loco moved under its own power for the first time in over 30 years.

Formation
The vehicles that made up the prototype High Speed Train are listed below, together with their current identity and use:

References

External links

Testing the prototype HST 

252
252
British Rail Departmental Units
Train-related introductions in 1972